Yeshiva Pachad Yitzchok is a yeshiva in Jerusalem, Israel, established in the late 1970s by Rabbi Yitzchak Hutner in the Har Nof neighborhood. Hutner had served as the long-standing Rosh yeshiva of Yeshiva Rabbi Chaim Berlin and Kollel Gur Aryeh in Brooklyn, New York City. Upon the passing of Hutner in 1980, leadership of the yeshiva passed to his son-in-law, Rabbi Yonasan David who is the present Rosh Yeshiva. Rabbi Chaim Yitzchok Kaplan serves as the deputy Rosh Yeshiva of Yeshiva Pachad Yitzchok.

Gallery

External links
 Yeshiva Pachad Yitzchok building, YouTube, 30 seconds
 Purim at Yeshiva Pachad Yitzchak in Eretz Yisroel, Yeshiva World News on Instagram, 60 seconds

Pachad Yitzchok

References